Brian Anderson may refer to:

 Brian Anderson (academic) (born 1941), Australian professor
 Brian Anderson (British boxer) (born 1961), British boxer
 Brian Anderson (Irish boxer) (born 1939), Irish boxer
 Brian Anderson (rugby union), Scottish rugby union referee
 Brian Anderson (sportscaster), (born 1971), sports announcer for the Milwaukee Brewers and Turner Sports
 Brian Anderson (pitcher) (born 1972), former baseball pitcher, current broadcaster for the Tampa Bay Rays
 Brian Anderson (outfielder) (born 1982), baseball outfielder
 Brian Anderson (skateboarder) (born 1976), professional skateboarder
 Brian Anderson (third baseman) (born 1993), baseball third baseman
 Brian C. Anderson, editor

See also
 Brian Andersen (disambiguation)
 Bryan Anderson (disambiguation)